Nikos Papadopoulos (born 11 April 1990) is a Greek professional footballer who plays as a goalkeeper for Super League club Asteras Tripolis.

Career
On 16 May 2018, Papadopoulos signed a two-year contract with Asteras Tripolis.
On 13 May 2019, he put pen to paper to a contract extension, until the summer of 2022.

On 21 March 2021, Papadopoulos scored the first, and only to date, goal of his career, through a powerful shot from the penalty area in the 97th minute of play. This goal, which helped Asteras achieve a 2–2 draw in their match against Panathinaikos for the Superleague Greece championship playoffs, marked the first time a goalkeeper scored a goal in the Greek top tier since Arian Beqaj in 2001, and in Greek professional football in general since Gennadios Xenodochof in 2015.

Career statistics

References

Living people
Footballers from Athens
Greek footballers
Association football goalkeepers
Greek expatriate footballers
Greek expatriate sportspeople in Germany
Atromitos F.C. players
Olympiacos F.C. players
Fortuna Düsseldorf players
PAS Lamia 1964 players
Panionios F.C. players
Asteras Tripolis F.C. players
Super League Greece players
2. Bundesliga players
Expatriate footballers in Germany
1990 births